Verdell Mathis (November 18, 1914 – October 30, 1998) was a baseball infielder and pitcher in the Negro leagues. He played from 1940 to 1948, primarily for the Memphis Red Sox.

References
 Negro League Baseball Museum

External links
 and Seamheads

1914 births
1988 deaths
Chicago American Giants players
Memphis Red Sox players
People from Crittenden County, Arkansas
Philadelphia Stars players
20th-century African-American sportspeople
Baseball infielders
Baseball pitchers